The 'Mengame Gorilla Sanctuary, also known as Mengame Wildlife Sanctuary, is found in Cameroon. It was established in 2001. This site is 1,218.07 km².

References

Protected areas of Cameroon
Protected areas established in 2001
2001 establishments in Cameroon